The St. Nicodemus and St. Joseph of Arimathea Church is a Catholic church located in Ramla, the capital city of Central District in Israel.

The present church was built in the nineteenth century on a site that Christians claim that is the biblical Arimathea, the hometown of Joseph of Arimathea, a character who, according to the Gospel account, was the owner of the tomb in which the body of Jesus was deposited after the crucifixion.

The church is managed by the order of the Franciscans, which has a square bell tower and a painting on the altar attributed to Titian and was donated by the city of Madrid in 1846.

See also
Roman Catholicism in Israel
St. Joseph of Arimathea

References

Roman Catholic churches in Israel
Buildings and structures in Ramla
Franciscan churches in Israel
Joseph of Arimathea